Ka-fe Beau is a town in Saint George Parish, Grenada.  It is located at the southern end of the island, on the western coast.

References 

Populated places in Grenada